Yan Jeou-rong is a Taiwanese politician. He was the acting Minister of the Public Construction Commission of the Executive Yuan in August–October 2013.

Education
Yan obtained his bachelor's degree in civil engineering from Chung Yuan Christian University and master's degree in structural engineering and construction from the Asian Institute of Technology in Thailand.

References

Political office-holders in the Republic of China on Taiwan
Living people
Chung Yuan Christian University alumni
Year of birth missing (living people)